Nathorst Land is the land area between Van Keulenfjorden and Van Mijenfjorden on Spitsbergen, Svalbard.

The area is named after Alfred Gabriel Nathorst.

The Aspelintoppen mountain is the highest peak in Nathorst Land.

References

Peninsulas of Spitsbergen